The Capital Football State League is an amateur soccer league system based in the Canberra, Australian Capital Territory (ACT) region. The league system is organised and run by Capital Football. It represents levels three and below for men in the ACT league pyramid beneath the ACT NPL 1 and Capital Premier League, and level 2 and below for women beneath the ACT NPL W.

Men's structure

The ACT State League men's structure is broken into fourteen leagues composed of ten All-Age State League Competitions and four age restricted Masters Competitions. The system consists of a pyramid of leagues. Divisions 1-4 are bound together by the principle of promotion and relegation. The most successful club in each league rises to a higher league, whilst the club that finishes at the bottom of their league finds itself sinking down a level. Division 5 and 6 are open leagues for casual players.

Women's structure
The ACT State League women's structure is broken into five leagues and a masters league, at the top of the system is Division 1 (sometimes referred to as Women's Capital League), containing 8 clubs, of which, as of 2020, all eight are based in Canberra, Australian Capital Territory. Divisions 2 to 5 contain between 8 and 10 clubs each with fifteen clubs coming from Canberra and three coming from NSW (Queanbeyan, Yass and Palerang). In 2020 Capital Football restarted the Women's Masters League, containing 5 teams. The Women's Masters is predominantly for women of at least 35 years of age.

See also

League system, for a list of similar systems in other countries
Australian soccer league system, for an overview of Australia's league systems across the nation
Soccer in the Australian Capital Territory, for an overview of the entire soccer scene in the ACT

References

External links
 Capital Football home

Soccer leagues in the Australian Capital Territory
Soccer in the Australian Capital Territory